The Furniture, Manufacturing & Associated Workers Union is a trade union in New Zealand. It has a membership of 620, and is affiliated with the New Zealand Council of Trade Unions.

References

External links
 Furniture, Manufacturing & Associated Workers Union at the NZCTU.
   provides finding aid to article subject from the Special Collections, Washington State Historical Society (WSHS)

New Zealand Council of Trade Unions
Trade unions in New Zealand